The Montejunto Formation is an Oxfordian geologic formation in Portugal. Dinosaur remains diagnostic to the genus level are among the fossils that have been recovered from the formation.

Fossil content 
 ?Megalosaurus insignis (Tetanurae indet.)

See also 
 List of dinosaur-bearing rock formations
 List of stratigraphic units with few dinosaur genera

References

Bibliography 
  

Geologic formations of Portugal
Jurassic System of Europe
Jurassic Portugal
Oxfordian Stage
Limestone formations
Mudstone formations
Shallow marine deposits
Paleontology in Portugal